The Hajnal line is an imaginary line that is drawn between Saint Petersburg, Russia, and Trieste, Italy. 

In 1965, John Hajnal hypothesized that it divides Europe into two areas characterized by different levels of nuptiality. According to Hajnal, to the west of the line, marriage rates and thus fertility were comparatively low, and a significant minority of women married late or remained single; to the east of the line and in the Mediterranean and select pockets of Northwestern Europe, early marriage was the norm and high fertility was countered by high mortality.

In the 20th century, Hajnal's observations were assumed as valid by a wide variety of sociologists. However, since the early 21st century, his theory has been routinely criticized and rejected by scholars. Hajnal and other researchers did not have access to, or underplayed nuptiality research from behind the Iron Curtain which contradict their observations on central and eastern Europeans. Though some sociologists have called to revise or reject the concept of a "Hajnal line," other scientists continue to cite Hajnal’s research on the influence of western European marriage patterns.

Although John Hajnal himself was stridently anti-fascist and a survivor of the Jewish holocaust, his theory has been warmly received and heavily promoted by Neo-Nazis, and the alt-right.

The idea itself has its roots in earlier theories of the racial inferiority of Slavic people. Nazi anthropologist Werner Conze is credited with the earliest development of what would later be called the "Hajnal line". Werner Conze's work directly influenced the decision makers responsible for the Holocaust and the associated mass murder of millions of Slavic civilians in German-occupied territory during World War 2.

Origins
The earliest conception of the theory was created by Werner Conze, a Nazi anthropologist. He refined the racist ideas of his mentor, Gunther Ipsen, as well others, who sought to link racial attributes like skin color and ethnicity to marriage patterns. His deeply flawed analysis of Baltic nuptiality data left an impression on decision makers in the German military, convincing them of the latent racial inferiority and alienness of Slavic people. Since the 1990s, Werner Conze's influence has been linked by German scholars to the mass murder of millions of Slavic civilians during the German occupation of central and eastern European countries.

Overview
West of this line, the average age of marriage for women was 23 or older, men 26, spouses were relatively close in age, a substantial number of women married for the first time in their thirties and forties, and 10% to 20% of adults never married. East of the line, the mean age of both sexes at marriage was earlier, spousal age disparity was greater and marriage more nearly universal. This phenomenon has been described as the 'Western European marriage pattern'. Historical demographers have also noted that there are significant variations within the region; to the west of the line, about half of all women aged 15 to 50 years of age were married while the other half were widows or had never married; to the east of the line, about seventy percent of women in that age bracket were married while the other thirty percent were widows or nuns. That a number of widows remarried also kept the age of marriage comparatively high; if women married for the first time at 21 years of age and twenty percent of all weddings featured a widowed bride and the average age of remarriage was forty years then the average marriage age for women would be 24.8 years: (21 × 0.8) + (40 × 0.2) = 24.8. The proportion of marriages that were remarriages (widows and/or widowers marrying again) in the late 1500s was as high as thirty percent; that proportion had fallen to just over eleven percent in the early 1800s.

While the average age at first marriage had climbed to 25 for women and 27 for men in England and the Low Countries by the end of the 16th century, and the percentage of Englishwomen marrying fell from over 90% to just over 80% through the 17th century and their average age at first marriage rose to 26, there was nonetheless great variation within Western Europe; while Lowland Scotland saw patterns similar to England, with women married in the middle twenties after a period of domestic service, the high birth rate of Highland Scotland and the Hebrides imply a lower age of marriage for the bride. Similarly, in 1620 the average age of first marriage for Swedish women was roughly 20 years and the proportion of single women was less than 10%, but by the end of the 18th century it had risen to roughly 26 years and continued to climb with the celibacy rate as a result of falling infant mortality rates, declining famines, and other factors. Similarly, Ireland's age of marriage in 1830 was 23.8 for women and 27.5 for men where they had once been 21 and 25, respectively, and only about 10% of adults remained unmarried; in 1840, they had respectively risen to 24.4 and 27.7; in the decades after the Great Famine, the age of marriage had risen to 28–29 for women and 33 for men and as much as a third of Irishmen and a fourth of Irishwomen never married due to chronic economic problems that discouraged early marriage.

Effects
The Western European pattern of late and non-universal marriage restricted fertility massively, especially when it was coupled with very low levels of childbirth out of wedlock. Birth control took place by delaying marriage more than suppressing fertility within it. A woman's life-phase from menarche (generally reached on average at 14 years, at about 12 years for elite women) to the birth of her first child was unusually long, averaging ten years.

Economy
Class differences played a great role in when a couple could marry; the wealthier that a couple was, the likelier that they were to marry earlier. Noblewomen and gentlewomen married early, but they were a small minority; a thousand marriage certificates issued by the Diocese of Canterbury between 1619 and 1660 show that only one bride was aged thirteen years, four were fifteen, twelve were sixteen, seventeen were seventeen, and the other 966 of the brides were aged nineteen years or older when they married for the first time. The church stipulated that both the bride and groom must be at least 21 years of age to marry without the consent of their families; the most common ages of marriage were 22 for women, 24 for men; the median ages were 22.8 for women and 25.5 for men; the average ages were 24 years for women and nearly 28 years for men. The youngest brides were nobility and gentry.

The moderate rates of fertility, mortality, and marriage within the region were tied to the economy; when times were better, more people could afford to marry early and thus have more children and conversely more people delayed marriages (or remained unmarried) and bore fewer children when times were bad. This contrasts with societies outside of this region, where early marriage for both sexes was virtually universal and high fertility was counteracted by high mortality; in the 15th century, a Tuscan woman 21 years of age would be seen as past marriageable age, the deadline for which was 19 years, and easily 97 percent of Florentine women were married by the age of 25 years while 21 years was the typical age of an English bride.

Significance
The region's late marriage pattern has received considerable scholarly attention in part because it appears to be unique; it has not been found in any other part of the world prior to the 20th century. However, similar marriage patterns, with a high degree of female agency (as measured by the so-called 'female-friendliness index') have been documented in Mongolia, Japan, and parts of Southeast Asia. The origins of the late marriage system are a matter of conjecture prior to the 16th century when the demographic evidence from family reconstitution studies makes the prevalence of the pattern clear; while evidence is scant, most English couples seemed to marry for the first time in their early twenties before the Black Death and afterward, when economic conditions were better, often married in their late teens. Many historians have wondered whether this unique conjugal regime might explain, in part, why capitalism first took root in Northwestern Europe, contributing to the region's relatively low mortality rates, hastening the fragmentation of the peasantry and the precocious formation of a mobile class of landless wage-earners. Others have highlighted the significance of the late marriage pattern for gender relations, for the relative strength of women's position within marriage, the "conjugal" dowry system of Northwestern Europe in which the dowry merged with the husband's wealth and would thus grow or shrink depending on circumstances (perhaps an incentive for many women to work), the centrality of widows in village land inheritance, and the vitality of women's community networks.

See also
 Demographic transition

References

Further reading 
 
 
 
 
 

Demographic maps